The China Christian Council (CCC) was founded in 1980 as an umbrella organization for all Protestant churches in the People's Republic of China with Bishop K. H. Ting as its president. It works to provide theological education and the publication of Bibles  (mostly in the Chinese Union Version), hymnals (the Chinese New Hymnal mostly), and other religious literature. It encourages the exchange of information among local churches in evangelism, pastoral work and administration. It has formulated a church order for local churches, and seeks to continue to develop friendly relations with churches overseas.

History 
In the spring of 1979, Chinese churches resumed worship after the Cultural Revolution. In order to revive the church, the China Christian Council was founded at the third national Christian conference in 1980, to unite and provide services for churches in China, formulating Church Order and encouraging theological education. Daniel Bays suggests that there is "a real desire for pastoral and congregational nurturing and spiritual development in the CCC, and perhaps a desire to separate from the direct political role of the TSPM."

Together with the Three-Self Patriotic Movement, the organizations are known as the lianghui, or "two organizations." Through the CCC, the registered Protestant church participates in the World Council of Churches. The CCC serves to unite and provide services for churches in China by formulating Church Order, encouraging theological education through seminaries and Bible schools, such as Nanjing Union Theological Seminary, publishing Bibles and other Christian materials, and coordinating training programs for churches.

In the recent 30 years, Christianity in China has developed rapidly. It introduces the best developing period in Chinese Christian history. Incomplete statistics indicate that there may be over 23 million Christians throughout the country, 30 times more than in 1949. There may also be over 56,000 churches and meeting points, 70 percent of which are newly built. More than 55 million copies of the Bible have been printed, 3,500,000 copies per year in recent years. There are a total of 21 theological seminaries with more than 1900 students in China.

The CCC/TSPM headquarters are No. 219, Jiujiang Road, Huangpu District, Shanghai (Postcode: 200002). The organizations jointly publish the Tian Feng magazine.

Leadership 
The current leadership were elected at the tenth National Christian Conference held in November 2018.

 President 
 Rev. Wu Wei 

 General Secretary
 Rev. Shan Weixiang

Ministries 
 The Ministry of Theological Renewal
 Publication Ministry
 Theological Education and Training Ministry
 Social Service Ministry
 Overseas Exchange Ministry

Departments 
 Overseas Relations Department
 Training Department
 Publication Department
 Tian Feng Editorial Department
 Social Service Department
 Research Department
 Administration Office

References

External links 
  
 Main Churches and Theological Seminaries Under China Christian Council 
 The Amity Foundation

Protestantism in China
Members of the World Council of Churches
Christian organizations established in 1980
Christian denominations in Asia
Christian denominations established in the 20th century
National councils of churches
1980 establishments in China